(Old Norse) and  or  (Old English) are terms for "blood sacrifice" in Norse paganism and Anglo-Saxon paganism respectively. A comparanda  can also be reconstructed for wider Germanic paganism.

A  could be dedicated to any of the Germanic gods, the spirits of the land, and to ancestors.
The sacrifice involved aspects of a sacramental meal or feast.

Etymology
The word  is an Old Norse strong neuter noun (genitive ). The corresponding Old English neuter  (genitive ) may be influenced by Old Norse; the Old English gospels have prefixed  "sacrifice".

The reconstructed Proto-Germanic form of the noun is  "sacrifice, worship". Connected to this is the Proto-Germanic strong verb  with descendants in Gothic , Old Norse , Old English  and Old High German , all of which mean "to sacrifice, offer, worship".

The word also appears in a compound attested in Old Norse as  "house of worship" and in Old High German as  "temple". With a different nominative affix, the same stem is found in the Proto-Germanic noun  "sacrifice" – attested in Gothic * (*) in  "worshipper of God" and Old High German  "offering, sacrifice"). This stem is thought to be connected to the Proto-Germanic verb  "to blow; to bloom, blossom", as are the words for "blood" (Proto-Germanic ) and "bloom" (Proto-Germanic ).

Rites and beliefs
The verb  meant "to worship with sacrifice", or "to strengthen". The written sources and the archaeological record indicate that in Old Norse religious practice the sacrifice of animals, particularly pigs and horses, played a significant part in the blót. More than just a simple sacrifice, the blót was central to all the ritual activities that took place in Norse sacral structures. Closer in conception to a gift, the blót usually involved killing animals, and sometimes humans, in ritual fashion with their blood being poured into bowls or onto stones. Twigs were dipped into the liquid and shaken, throwing a spray onto the onlookers and the buildings. At the temple-hall of Hofstaðir in northern Iceland, oxen were decapitated in seasonal rituals for many years. Osteological analysis of the bones shows that the animals were killed with blows to the neck by axe or sword. This method was intended to produce the spectacle of a shower of arterial blood.

The ritual killing of animals was followed by feasts on the meat, as described in the Eddic and Scaldic poetry, the Icelandic sagas, and on rune stones. The meat was boiled in large cooking pits with heated stones, either indoors or outdoors, and ale or mead (mjöð) was drunk in the ceremony.

In Hákonar saga Góða, (Saga of Hákon the Good) in Snorri Sturlason's Heimskringla, Earl Sigurđr of Hlađir (Earl Hákon's father) is said to have given a great sacrificial feast at Hlađir, and to have borne its entire expense. The passage states that it was the duty of the chieftain who provided the feast to consecrate the ale and all the sacrificial meat. Such feasts are usually called by the Old Norse blótzveizla in the texts.

Snorri describes the farmers of Thrándheimr bringing provisions to the temple and sacrificing there. The blood of the slaughtered animals was considered to have special powers and it was sprinkled on the altars, on the walls and on the participants themselves. The chieftain passed a sacrificial cup over the fire and consecrated it along with the food. Beer was drunk and toasts to Óðinn were made for  victory in battle, and to Njǫrðr and Freyre for a bountiful harvest and for peace. A similar toast was raised at the celebration of Jól: , "for a good harvest, fertility, and peace" (frith).

Sacrificial feasts (blótveizlur, blótdrykkjur) had a prominent place in the ancient religious practices of the Scandinavians, and were part of the seasonal festivals attended by large numbers of people. Family rituals such as the álfablót in western Sweden mentioned by the Norwegian skald Sigvatr Þórðarson in an early 11th-century poem, were usually performed on farm homesteads.

The written sources speak of sacrifices made of prisoners of war; Roman descriptions of Germanic tribes sacrificing their defeated enemies to Mars or Mercury have a similarity with customs related to the cult of Óðinn in Old Norse religion. The Icelandic skáld Helgi Trausti mentions his killing an enemy as a sacrifice to Óðinn; Egils saga einhenda ok Ásmundar berserkjabana and Orkneyinga saga describe the sacrificing of captive enemies to Óðinn. In depositions of remains found near Uppland, most of the human bodies are of young males with healed bone trauma, a possible congruence with the sacrificed captives of war mentioned in the written corpus. In almost all instances, human sacrifices occurring in the context of the Old Norse texts are related to Óðinn.

Locations
A building where the blót took place was called a hof (compare German ) and there are many place names derived from this in e.g. Scania, West Götaland and East Götaland. Excavations at the medieval churches of Mære in Trøndelag and at Old Uppsala provide the few exceptions where church sites are associated with earlier churches.

Denmark

Lejre
The German Thietmar wrote before 932 that the Daner had their main cult centre on Zealand at Lejre, where they gathered every nine years and sacrificed ninety-nine people but also horses, dogs and hens. There are however no historical records from Scandinavian sources nor any archeological findings supporting this. Archaeological excavations have indeed revealed Lejre to be of great importance and in fact the seat of the royal family dating to at least the Iron Age. There is not conclusive evidence that Lejre was the site of a main cult centre though, but excavations around lake Tissø not far to the West, have revealed an ancient hof of great importance.

Norway

Mære
Snorri Sturluson relates of a meeting between the peasants of Trøndelag and king Haakon I of Norway, a meeting which ended in a religious feud centered around the blót. Haakon was raised at the Christian English court and had returned to claim the throne of his father Harald Fairhair (the unifier of Norway) and intended to Christianize the country. In spite of the fact that the peasants had elected Haakon king at the Thing they opposed his religious ideas.

During this ceremony, the king also had to participate, although he was a Christian, and he had to drink of the mead that was offered and consecrated for Odin, Njord and Freyja. The peasants also wanted him to eat of the meat, but he only gaped over the handle of the cauldron and held a linen cloth between his mouth and the meat. The peasants were not at all satisfied with a king who would not participate fully in the blót. The king had however, been seriously humiliated and later he converted to the old faith. Tradition says that he was buried according to the old ways.

Sacrifices in Norway

According to the Sturlubók and Hauksbók versions of Landnámabók, the first settler in Iceland, Ingólfr, prepared for his voyage to claim land there in this way, as translated by Aðalsteinsson:

Þórólfr Mostrarskeggi made preparations similar to those of Ingólfr before he left Norway, according to Eyrbyggja saga:

Sweden

Gotland
The Gutasaga was recorded at the beginning of the 13th century, still close enough in time for people to remember something of the ancient traditions. Only near the end of the 12th century did Christianity become the official form of religion on Gotland. The Gutasaga tells of the blót on the island of Gotland in the Baltic Sea:

Uppsala

The German chronicler Adam of Bremen has described how the  blót  was done at the Temple at Uppsala at Old Uppsala in Sweden, ca 1070:
Thor was the most powerful god and ruled over thunder and lightning, wind and rain, sunshine and crops. He sat in the centre with a hammer (Mjolnir) in his hand, and on each side were Odin, the god of war, in full armour and Frey, the god of peace and love, attributed with an enormous erect phallus. All the pagan gods have their priests who offer them the people's sacrifices. If there is disease or famine, they sacrifice to Thor, if war to Odin and if weddings to Frey.

Every ninth year there is a blót of nine days, a common feast for everyone in Sweden. Then they sacrifice nine males of each species, even men, and the bodies are hung from the branches of a grove near the temple. No one is exempt from this blót and everyone sends gifts to the shrine, even the kings. Those who are Christian have to pay a fee not to take part in the blót.

Adam of Bremen considered this financial penalty to be very harsh.

It is possible that the last nine-day blót was performed in 1078. The Temple at Uppsala was probably destroyed by King Ingold I in 1087. For quite some time there had been civil war between Christians and pagans every nine years, and this was the year of the last battle.

The blót was also performed to see how large the next harvest would be. Then the Thing of all Swedes was held and there was a grand fair, the Disting. The Disting survived Christianity, and the tradition has never been interrupted. The fair is still held every first Tuesday in February in Uppsala, even though the date has sometimes been moved within the month. In 1968, the tradition of discussing official matters was resumed.

Tiveden
In the Swedish forest of Tiveden, there were for a long time after Christianisation reports of pagan sacrifices taking place. One such site was Trollkyrka (lit. "troll-church"). In 1941, the Swedish folklorist B.G. Carlshult recorded a folk poem about it.

Specific blóts
The Old Norse calendar consisted of a summer half year and a winter half year, not the four seasons modern Europeans are accustomed to. The winter half of the year began in mid-to-late October, the summer half of the year began in mid-to-late April. Some blót were associated with these turning points.

According to the Old Norse corpus, a blót and the sacrifice of animals took place in autumn around 20 October (Gregorian calendar) at the beginning of "the winter nights". This was one of the periods into which the year was divided according to the pagan calendar, and it might also have marked the beginning of the new year. The "winter nights" blót is the pagan ceremonial feast best known from the written record. This blót was also called dísablót and was dedicated to the female fertility deities, disir, or diser. Some sources mention blót dedicated to Freyr during "the winter nights".

Beginning of Winter half year
 Winter Nights,
 Haust blót "autumn sacrifice", mentioned in the Ynglinga saga and in other texts. Freyr was the most important god at this event.
 Völsi blót: The Völsi was the penis of a stallion, and the rites surrounding it are described in Völsa þáttr. It was taken from a stallion during the autumn butchering, and it is said that the mistress of the homestead considered it to be her god, and kept it in a coffin together with linen and leeks (see also horse sacrifice). In the evening everybody gathered in the main building.  The mistress presented the penis from the coffin, greeted it with a prayer, and let it pass from person to person. Everybody greeted it with the religious phrase May Mörnir receive the holy sacrifice!.
 The álfablót or Elven blót was small scale and was celebrated at the homestead and led by its mistress. Not much is known about these rites, since they were surrounded by secrecy and strangers were not welcome during the time of the rituals. However, since the elves were collective powers closely connected with the ancestors some assume that it had to do with the ancestor cult and the life force of the family.
 Dísablót
 Blōtmōnaþ:In the early Anglo-Saxon period, November was known as Blōtmōnaþ, when cattle were offered to the gods.

During winter
 Yule, an important sacrifice celebrated some time after Winter solstice. When Christianity arrived in Scandinavia the yuleblót (or winterblót) was celebrated on 12 January (note: Date as of the previous Julian calendar. Hence it is not on 12 January in the current calendar.)
 Þorrablót (Iceland)
 Freyr blot (Sweden): The Óláfs saga Tryggvasonar en mesta has an account of a priestess of Freyr travelling across eastern Sweden (Uppland or Södermanland) with an image of the god in wintertime, celebrating a sacrifice for fertility.

Spring
 Dísablót

Midsummer

The Icelandic festival,  Jónsmessa (St John's Mass), or Midsummer Night,  celebrated on 24 June near the summer solstice, is mentioned in Ágrip, a late 12th-century history of the kings of Norway written in Old Norse. It says in chapter 19 that King Óláfr Tryggvason:      

  Sigrblót: the Ynglinga saga states one of the great festivals of the calendar is at sumri, þat var sigrblót "in summer, for victory". An offering was given to Odin, and then the celebrants drank for victory in war; this blót was the starting date for Viking expeditions and wars.

Post-Christianisation period

In Scandinavian  Yule or Christmas traditions in particular, such as the Christmas porridge, of which an extra bowl  often is served and carried outdoors, because this is a meal shared with the guardian of the homestead, the tomte (nisse in Danish and Norwegian, tonttu in Finnish), a land wight.

The Þorrablót is an Icelandic tradition introduced in the 19th century, deliberately harking back to the term blót associated with pre-Christian times.

The blót at Yule may be the origin of the Orcadian practice recorded in the 18th century by which each family in Sandwick that rears pigs would slaughter one sow on the 17th of December which was known as Sow Day. A similar practice is recorded in the 19th century in which each household on North Ronaldsay slaughtered a sheep known as the Yule sheep on Christmas Eve.  

Reconstructionist adherents of contemporary Germanic paganism have developed traditions of blót rituals celebrated in a contemporary context since the 1970s. In these practices, animal sacrifice is usually replaced with offerings of food or drink, although there remains a large focus on sharing food and strengthening relationships.

See also
 Housel
 Lác
 Żertwa

Notes

References
 Bammesberger, Alfred (1990). Die Morphologie der urgermanischen Nomens. Heidelberg: Carl Winters Universitätsverlag. .
 Näsström, Britt-Mari (Oslo 2001). Blot: Tro og offer i det førkristne Norden. .
 Orel, Vladimir (2003). A Handbook of Germanic Etymology. Leiden: Brill. .
 Steinsland, G.; Meulengracht Sørensen, P. (1998). Människor och makter i vikingarnas värld. .

External links

 a-time-for-blot-
 Knowst How to Blot
 Definition of Blót – Zöega dict.
 Blót explained according to Heithni

Anglo-Saxon paganism
Germanic animal sacrifice
Ceremonies
Viking practices
Spiritual practice